A mitre is a traditional, ceremonial head-dress of ancient Jewish high priests and Christian bishops and other clergy.

Mitre may also refer to:

Places
 Isla Mitre or Lavoisier Island, an island of Antarctica
 Mitre Peninsula, Tierra del Fuego, Argentina
 The Mitre (Alaska), a mountain summit in the Chugach Mountains, Alaska
 The Mitre (Alberta), a mountain summit in Banff National Park, Canada
 Mitre, New Zealand, a mountain in the North Island
 Mitre Peak (New Zealand), a mountain in the South Island
 Mitre Peak, Pakistan
 Mitre Square, London, England, UK

Businesses
 The Mitre, Bayswater, a London pub
 The Mitre, Greenwich, a London pub
 Mitre Corporation, a high technology systems engineering company
 Mitre Line (Buenos Aires), a commuter rail service in Buenos Aires, Argentina
 Mitre Sports International, a manufacturer of sporting goods, notably footballs
 Museo Mitre, Buenos Aires, a museum dedicated to Argentine history
 Radio Mitre, an Argentine radio station

Other uses
 Mitre joint, a type of joint in woodwork or plumbing
 Mason's mitre, a type of mitre joint
 Saint Mitre (433–466), Catholic saint
 The Mitre, Newcastle upon Tyne, England, a building
 Mitre (coin), a coin minted in Europe and circulated in Ireland and England

People with the surname
 Bartolomé Mitre (1821-1906), Argentine president, military figure and author
 Engie Mitre (born 1981), Panamanian footballer
 Sergio Mitre (born 1981), American Major League Baseball pitcher
 Santiago Mitre (born 1980), Argentine film director and screenwriter

See also
 Mitre 10, a hardware and timber retailer in Australia
 Mitre 10 (New Zealand), a hardware and timber retailer in New Zealand
 Mitre box, a tool for guiding a saw to make mitre cuts
 Mitre saw, a saw for making mitre joint
Mitre square, a tool for marking and checking angles